Balada de Otro Tiempo is an album by the Puerto Rican singer Roy Brown. It was released by Brown's label, Discos Lara-Yarí, in 1989.

Background and recording
Balada de Otro Tiempo was recorded from February to March 1989 at Ochoa Studios in San Juan, Puerto Rico. Like Brown's previous albums, it contains songs inspired by poems by Luis Palés Matos ("Pueblo negro") and Juan Antonio Corretjer ("Inabón Yunes"). It includes the song, "Melena al viento", based on a poem by Luis Lloréns Torres. The Puerto Rican singer/songwriter Rucco Gandía also contributes with the song "Sofía".

Track listing

Personnel

Musicians 
 Roy Brown - guitars
 Rucco Gandía - bass guitarand production
 Eduardo Reyes 
 Tato Santiago - keyboards
 Eguie Castrillo - percussion
 Pedro Guzmán - cuatro
 Luis Juliá - guitars
 Jimmy Rivera - drums
 Nicky Aponte

Recording and production 
 Hilton Colón - recording

Notes 

1989 albums
Roy Brown (Puerto Rican musician) albums